Hanwha Aqua Planet 63 is an aquarium that opened in 1985 in the 63 Building, Yeouido, Seoul, South Korea. It was the first public aquarium in the country. The 63 Building was the tallest building in Korea when it was built, and is still an iconic building in Seoul. The aquarium hosts about 1,000,000 visitors each year.

History
The aquarium was opened in 1985, occupying  of the three basement levels in the 63 Building (the third basement is an equipment level and not open to the public). Its mission was to "be a center of education for those interested in learning more about marine life," and it reproduced ocean habitats from around the world. The harbor seal show opened in 1990, and is still showing daily.
In 2016, Seaworld 63 was renovated and re-opened, and named as Aquaplanet 63.

Animals
Aqua Planet 63 is currently home to 20,000+ animals representing 400+ species, including king penguin, jackass penguin, pirarucu, piranha, Oriental small-clawed otter, harbor seal, sea lion.

Exhibits

The aquarium includes 80 tanks, 54 of which are available for public viewing, with the rest being used for breeding rare sea creatures.

Migratory Tank
This track shape tank contains  of water, and is home to migratory species that are constantly circling the tank.

Shows

Harbor seal
There are four harbor seals and two of them are playing show four times a day. Quite similar to the sea lion show from many other aquariums.

Sea lion
A South American sea lion and a California sea lion are playing shows three times a day. The show is like a musical where most of the performance is done by trainers.

See also
Aqua Planet (aquarium)
Aqua Planet Jeju
Hanwha Group

Notes

External links

Aquaria in South Korea
Buildings and structures in Seoul
Tourist attractions in Seoul
1985 establishments in South Korea